Jaregoceras is a genus of nautiloids from the Upper Devonian discosorid that probably belongs to the family Discosoridae.

References

 Curt Teichert, 1964. Nautiloidea-Discosorida; Treatise on Invertebrate Paleontology, Part K. Geological Society of America and University of Kansas Press
 Jack Sepkoski's list of cephalopod genera  

Prehistoric nautiloid genera
Discosorida